Slovene or Slovenian may refer to:

 Something of, from, or related to Slovenia, a country in Central Europe
 Slovene language, a South Slavic language mainly spoken in Slovenia
 Slovenes, an ethno-linguistic group mainly living in Slovenia
 Slavic peoples, an Indo-European ethno-linguistic group
 Ilmen Slavs,  the northernmost tribe of the Early East Slavs

Language and nationality disambiguation pages